William Winton McKeever Jr. (1916 – July 8, 2000) was an American football tackle who played one season for the Los Angeles Bulldogs of the Pacific Coast Football League (PCFL). He played college football for Cornell and was selected in the tenth round (84th overall) of the 1939 NFL Draft by the Philadelphia Eagles.

Early life and education
McKeever was born in 1916, and attended Episcopal Academy in Pennsylvania, graduating in 1935. After graduating he joined Cornell University in New York, being one of the top freshman players. He made the varsity team the following season, and was given a letter. In the first seven games of the 1936 season, McKeever was a starter in all but one of them. He was a top player on the Cornell team, and earned letters in each of his three seasons on the varsity squad. McKeever was named first-team All-American by Grantland Rice following the 1938 season. He was an inductee into the school's hall of fame in 1978.

Professional career
After graduating from college, McKeever was selected in the tenth round (84th overall) of the 1939 NFL Draft by the Philadelphia Eagles, though he did not play. After being out of football for three seasons, he signed with the Los Angeles Bulldogs of the Pacific Coast Football League (PCFL) in 1942. He appeared in four total games with the Bulldogs.

Personal life
His father, Bill Sr., was a starter on the 1897 Cornell team and was a team captain.

References

Date of birth missing
1916 births
2000 deaths
American football tackles
Cornell Big Red men's track and field athletes
Cornell Big Red football players
Philadelphia Eagles players
Los Angeles Bulldogs players